Nordic Challenge Cup (NCC) was the predecessor of the popular and long-running sports car racing series Interserie, which is known as the "European Can-Am" and still exists today. NCC consisted of only three races in 1969 and was replaced by Interserie in 1970. It is now mostly remembered for the large number of Formula One drivers competing in it. Among these drivers were Jochen Rindt, who won the F1 World Drivers' Championship posthumously in 1970, and Jackie Oliver. The series also launched the career of Leo Kinnunen who went on to win the World Sportscar Championship the next year.

Races

Final standings

External links
 NCC 1969 Results

Sports car racing series
Auto racing series in Finland
Auto racing series in Sweden